The South Jersey Transportation Authority (SJTA) is a quasi-private agency created by the New Jersey Legislature in 1991 to manage transportation-related services in the six southern New Jersey counties: Atlantic, Camden, Cape May, Cumberland, Gloucester, and Salem.

The Authority, successor to the New Jersey Expressway Authority and the Atlantic County Transportation Authority (ACTA), is responsible for coordinating South Jersey's transportation system, including highways, airports and other transportation needs. The Authority's transportation network includes public highways, including the Atlantic City Expressway, and transportation projects, such as the Atlantic City International Airport; parking facilities and functions once performed by ACTA; other public transportation facilities, and related economic development facilities in South Jersey.

Thirteen interchanges provide access to arterial routes, including the Garden State Parkway, and seven toll barriers control the collection of toll revenues.

Aviation services include scheduled flights and charter service as well as ground handling of aircraft, fueling, aircraft maintenance, parking, registration and collection of landing and parking fees through fixed-base operators.

South Jersey Transportation Authority operates shuttle buses and vans to worksites in Burlington, Camden and Gloucester counties.

Shuttle routes

References

External links
South Jersey Transportation Authority
SJTA Shuttles & Parking

State agencies of New Jersey
Government agencies established in 1991
Transportation planning
Transportation in Atlantic County, New Jersey
Transportation in Camden County, New Jersey
Transportation in Cape May County, New Jersey
Transportation in Cumberland County, New Jersey
Transportation in Gloucester County, New Jersey
Transportation in Salem County, New Jersey
Hammonton, New Jersey
1991 establishments in New Jersey
Toll road authorities of the United States